The Battle of Las Anod saw Somaliland National Army engage Puntland forces in Las Anod, capital of the Sool region. The ensuing battle resulted in Somaliland ousting the Puntland army from the city.

Overview 
Las Anod had until then been controlled by Puntland, who took control of the regional capital in 2002.

Somaliland had however been aiding local clan militias opposed to Puntland presence in the city. The clan militias were loyal to Ahmed Abdi Habsade, a former Puntland minister who later on defected to Somaliland.

Battle 
In October 2007, the conflict mushroomed into a regional conflict over control of the city of Las Anod, as Somaliland regular army forces mobilized from their base in the town of Adhicadeeye, west of the city, and entered the conflict. Puntland was slow to mobilize a counter-attack, as Puntland's weak economy and overstretched military obligations in Mogadishu prevented a rapid response. After assuming control of the city on October 15th, Somaliland moved Sool's regional administration into Las Anod. Between 10 and 20 people were reported to be dead.

See also 

 Battle of Tukaraq
 2010 Ayn Clashes

References

2007 in Somaliland
Las Anod
Las Anod